Othorene purpurascens is a species of moth of the family Saturniidae.

Distribution
The species can be found in Belize and French Guiana and from Mexico to Bolivia.

Subspecies
Othorene purpurascens purpurascens
Othorene purpurascens intermedia Rothschild, 1907

References

Othorene
Moths described in 1905